Yes It's You Lady is a 1982 album by American singer Smokey Robinson. As 1981's Being with You it was produced by George Tobin in association with Mike Piccirillo and recorded and mixed at Studio Sound Recorders, North Hollywood, California. It was released on the Motown sub-label Tamla.

Reception

The album was peaking at #33 in Billboard pop charts, and at #6 on the R&B charts. The two follow-up singles to 1981's chart success' "Being with you" were strangely no Robinson compositions: "Tell Me Tomorrow" peaked at #33 Billboard and #3 R&B charts, "Old Fashioned Love" at #60 Billboard and #17 R&B charts. The third and final single, Robinson's "Yes It's You Lady" only peaked at #107 Billboard, without entering the R&B charts.

William Ruhlmann of AllMusic gave 2 out of 5 stars. Robert Christgau rated the album as B, praising Robinson's mature voice and singing, while complaining about the weakness of the "material". Concluding with "he almost gets away with it anyway".

Track listing

Side A
"Tell Me Tomorrow" (Gary Goetzman, Mike Piccirillo) - 6:25
"Yes It's You Lady" (William "Smokey" Robinson) - 4:43
"Old Fashioned Love" (Gary Goetzman, Mike Piccirillo) - 3:12
"Are You Still Here" (William "Smokey" Robinson) - 2:33

Side B
"The Only Game In Town" (Gary Goetzman, Mike Piccirillo) - 4:50
"International Baby" (William "Smokey" Robinson) - 4:07
"Merry-Go-Ride" (Richard Williams) - 5:31
"I'll Try Something New" (William "Smokey" Robinson) - 3:34
"Destiny" (Forest Hairston) - 3:48

Personnel 
Fellow Miracles members Claudette Robinson, then Smokey's wife, contributed background vocals to this album, Marv Tarplin is featured on rhythm guitar.

 Smokey Robinson – lead and backing vocals 
 Bill Cuomo – keyboards
 Mike Piccirillo – synthesizers, guitar, bells, backing vocals 
 Marv Tarplin – rhythm guitar (2, 7, 8)
 Scott Edwards – bass
 Ed Greene – drums
 Howard Lee Wolen – percussion
 Joel Peskin – saxophones 
 David Stout – trombone
 Harry Kim – trumpet
 Bobby Bruce – violin
 Ivory Davis – backing vocals 
 Claudette Robinson – backing vocals
 Julia Waters Tillman – backing vocals
 Maxine Waters Willard – backing vocals
 Yvonne Wilkins – backing vocals

Production 
 Produced by George Tobin for George Tobin Productions, Inc. 
 Associate Producer – Mike Piccirillo
 Production Coordinators – Allan Rinde and Theresa Abrook
 Arranged and mixed by George Tobin and Mike Piccirillo
 Engineers – Howard Lee Wolen and Mark Wolfson
 Assistant Engineers – Ira Rubnitz, John Volaitis and Richie Griffin.
 Mastered by  Ken Perry at Capitol Records (Hollywood, CA).
 Album Coordinator – Barbara Ramsey
 Art Direction – Johnny Lee
 Artwork Design – Ginny Livingston
 Photography – David Alexander

References

External links
Yes It's You Lady on Discogs

Smokey Robinson albums
1982 albums
Motown albums